Soft El (Ꙥ ꙥ; italics: Ꙥ ꙥ) is a letter of the Cyrillic script.

Soft El is used in the Old Church Slavonic language to represent the soft l, a sound prevalent in several Slavic languages.

This letter is also used for the Cyrillization of Arabic.

Origin

The Soft El is a ligature of El (Л) and Ghe (Г).

Computing codes

See also
Cyrillic characters in Unicode
Soft De
Soft Em
En-ge